Yhonathan Fernando Bedoya Quintero (born 17 October 1996) is a Colombian professional footballer who plays as a striker.

Club career
Born in Medellín, Bedoya was transferred to Spain in 2014 to play for RCD Espanyol and two seasons he played for its reserves team in the Segunda División B.

In January 2018 Bedoya moved to Ukraine, signing a deal with Ukrainian Premier League side FC Karpaty Lviv.

References

External links

1996 births
Living people
Colombian footballers
Association football forwards
Segunda División B players
RCD Espanyol B footballers
Colombian expatriate footballers
Expatriate footballers in Spain
Colombian expatriate sportspeople in Spain
FC Karpaty Lviv players
Colombian expatriate sportspeople in Ukraine
Expatriate footballers in Ukraine
Ukrainian Premier League players
Footballers from Medellín